The Barendra Express is an inter-city train of Bangladesh Railway service. It gives service between Rajshahi and the northern Chilahati. It is not so much luxurious train in Bangladesh.

Schedule and stations 
The train departs from Chilahati at 05:50 am and arrives at Rajshahi at 12:20 pm. It departs from Rajshahi at 03:00 pm and reaches Chilahati at 09:25 pm. The Barendra Express is closed on Sundays during the week. The Train Stops on the following stations:-
 Rajshahi Railway Station
 
 Natore
 
 
 
 Joypurhat
 
 
 
 
 
 Nilphamari

References 

Named passenger trains of Bangladesh
Transport in Dhaka